Churchyard is a surname. Notable people with the surname include:

 Bill Churchyard (1878–1957), Australian rules footballer
 Steve Churchyard, English record producer
 Thomas Churchyard (–1604), English author
 Thomas Churchyard (painter) (1798–1865), English painter